Viens chez moi, j'habite chez une copine is a French comedy film directed by Patrice Leconte. It was released in 1981.

Plot

Guy is fired from is job, and asks to sleep and stay in the apartment of his friend, Daniel, who is living with his girlfriend, Françoise.
The more he stays, the more he creates disaster in the apartment.

Cast
 Michel Blanc : Guy
 Bernard Giraudeau : Daniel
 Thérèse Liotard : Françoise
 Marie-Anne Chazel : Catherine
 Anémone : Adrienne
 Bruno Moynot : The owner

References

External links

1980 films
1980 comedy films
French comedy films
Films directed by Patrice Leconte
1980s French films